U.S. Route 17 Alternate (US 17 Alt.) is a  alternate route of US 17 in South Carolina that travels between Pocotaligo and Georgetown. It has been four-laned in various segments since 1970.

Route description
US 17 Alt starts at the northern terminus of the US 17-US 21 concurrency near Pocotaligo as a two-lane highway. It heads north along US 21 through Yemassee, where it passes over CSX's Charleston Subdivision and then over SC 68. Due to the presence of a parallel railroad spur along the north side of SC 68, access to and from US ALT 17-21 is only available from bi-directional on-off ramps on the southwest and southeast corners of the bridge. The concurrency continues until US 21 splits off on its own to the northwest. From here it runs through  Hendersonville, and then Walterboro, where it merges with SC 63, becomes the northern terminus of SC 303, and the southern terminus of US 15. From that point, US 17 Alt moves away from I-95, running along the southeast side of Lowcountry Regional Airport and moving further northeast. In Summerville, it intersects US 78, has an interchange with I-26, and intersects US 176. At Moncks Corner, it intersects US 52 and is briefly concurrent with that route as the two cross the Dennis C. Bishop Bridge over the Tail Race Canal of the Cooper River just below Lake Moultrie. After crossing the W.H. Andrews Memorial Bridge over the Santee River, it joins another concurrency with US 521 in Sampit, and both routes finally terminate at US 17, along with the southern terminus of US 701 in  Georgetown.

History
US 17 Alt was established in 1951 as a renumbering of mainline US 17 from near Pocotaligo to Walterboro, SC 64 from Walterboro to Moncks Corner, SC 179 from Moncks Corner to Jamestown, and SC 528 north of Jamestown to Sampit.  US 17 Alt was also overlapped with US 52 in Moncks Corner, SC 41 around Jamestown, and US 521 between Sampit and Georgetown.

The first section to be widened to four lanes was in 1970 from US 78 to I-26. This followed with four-lane sections in Georgetown (1974), its concurrency with US 52 in Moncks Corner (1975), and its concurrency with SC 64 in Walterboro (1979).  Since the late 1990s, US 17 Alt has been widening slowly into four-lane from I-26 towards Moncks Corner.

A second US 17 Alt did exist in South Carolina from 1955 to 1994, from the Georgia state line to Limehouse. Today it is part of mainline US 17.

Major intersections

Summerville truck route

U.S. Route 17 Alternate Truck (US 17 Alt. Trk.) is a  truck route for US 17 Alt., mostly within the city limits of Summerville, South Carolina. It serves portions of southeastern Dorchester County and a very brief portion of southwestern Berkeley County. It is entirely concurrent with South Carolina Highway 642 (SC 642) and SC 165 for its entire length.

US 17 Alt. Trk. begins at an intersection with US 17 Alt. southwest of Summerville, in the southeastern part of Dorchester County. This intersection is also the western terminus of SC 642. US 17 Alt. Trk. and SC 642 travel on Dorchester Road nearly in a due east direction before curving to an east-southeast direction. In Limehouse Crossroads, they intersect SC 165 (Bacons Bridge Road). US 17 Alt. Trk. leaves SC 642 and turns left onto SC 165. The two highways travel to the north-northeast. Almost immediately, they cross over Dorchester Creek and the Sawmill Branch Trail and enter a southern part of Summerville. Just north of the intersection with the northern terminus of Jimbo Road, they leave the city limits. They intersect the western terminus of Mikel Drive and the eastern terminus of Edisto Drive, which leads to Flowertown Elementary and Newington Elementary schools. A short distance later, they re-enter Summerville. Almost immediately, they intersect the northern terminus of Trolley Road. Here, US 17 Alt. Trk. and SC 165, as well as the Bacons Bridge Road name, turn left. They proceed to the north-northwest. They cross over Sawmill Branch just before intersecting the southern terminus of both East Carolina Avenue and Berlin G. Myers Parkway. US 17 Alt. Trk. and SC 165 turns right onto the parkway and travel to the northeast. They pass Summerville Elementary School and Rollings Middle School of the Arts. They cross over East Richardson Avenue and some railroad tracks of Norfolk Southern Railway on an unnamed bridge before intersecting East 3rd North Street at the Senator Randy Scott Intersection. This road leads to the Summerville Visitors Center. Almost immediately is an intersection with US 78 (East 5th North Street). US 17 Alt. Trk. and SC 165 continue to the northeast and enter the southwestern part of Berkeley County, before curving to the north-northwest. They intersect US 17 Alt. (North Main Street). Here, both US 17 Alt. Trk. and SC 165 reach their northern terminus, and the roadway continues as Berkeley County Circle to the north-northwest.

See also

 Special routes of U.S. Route 17

References

External links

 
US 17 Alternate at Virginia Highways' South Carolina Highway Annex (Mapmikey's South Carolina Highways Page)

17 Alternate (South Carolina)
17 Alternate
Alternate (South Carolina)
Transportation in Beaufort County, South Carolina
Transportation in Hampton County, South Carolina
Transportation in Colleton County, South Carolina
Transportation in Dorchester County, South Carolina
Transportation in Berkeley County, South Carolina
Transportation in Williamsburg County, South Carolina
Transportation in Georgetown County, South Carolina
Summerville, South Carolina
Goose Creek, South Carolina
Georgetown, South Carolina